The Lastochka is a German/Russian commuter intercity electric multiple unit train used across multiple Russian cities, based on the Siemens Desiro design and manufactured by Siemens and Ural Locomotives.

History
In 2009, Russian Railways commissioned Siemens to develop a suburban dual-system electric train adapted to Russian conditions. The new trains were planned to be used in Sochi for suburban passenger traffic during the 2014 Winter Olympics and then to be partially transferred to other train lines with non-stop service routes.

Previously, Siemens had already produced dual-system Sapsan trains (Velaro RUS) for Russian Railways. The design of the new electric train was based on the five-car Siemens Desiro ML electric train. On 29 December 2009, Russian Railways signed a contract with the German company Siemens for the production of 54 Siemens Desiro RUS electric trains worth €410 million.

The trains received the ES1 series designation and were branded as Lastochka. All 54 trains were manufactured in Germany.

In March 2022, after Russia invaded Ukraine, Siemens put all new business and international deliveries in Russia and Belarus on hold. In June 2022 Siemens Chief Executive Officer Roland Busch condemned the war in Ukraine and announced that the company had decided to wind down its industrial business activities in Russia. In line with the requirement of Russian Railways for "technology transfer", most components for Lastochka can now be locally sourced, with over 80% of the latest trains being Russian made.

Train design 
Dual-system trains with automatic system transfer were the ideal solution for amalgamating pre-existing railway lines in the region of the Olympic Games. There, the main railway network operating in flat terrain along the coast of the Black Sea had been electrified with direct current at 3 kV, while the lines built in the mountainous section of Adler – Krasnaya Polyana had been electrified with AC voltage at 25 kV, 50 Hz, appropriate for the steep gradients, and hence much higher power demands. Dual-system electric trains allow commuter rail routes covering sections of both DC and AC track with no need to stop at places where the electric power changes. With the technology, the trains are able to run directly from Adler to Krasnodar without stopping at the Goryachiy Klyuch changeover station.

All technical solutions adopted by Siemens in the design of the new Desiro ML RUS electric trains were discussed with experts from specialized research institutes and were approved by Russian Railways. Siemens consulted many Russian experts in high-speed railways—especially those involved in the Velaro RUS high-speed trains construction—for the design decisions concerning the Desiro ML train design and construction.

In particular, the base platform of the Desiro ML train had to be adapted to the Russian gauge of 1,520 mm and the demands of the harsh Russian winter. The topographical conditions in the region of the Olympic Games present higher requirements for automated systems and traction equipment. The design and construction efforts were focused particularly on the head car of the train.

In March 2011, LLC Ural Locomotives—a joint venture of Siemens AG and Sinara Group—and LLC Aeroexpress formed a joint venture to manufacture electric trains in Russia at the Ural Locomotives plant in Verkhnyaya Pyshma (Sverdlovsk Oblast). Production started in late 2013 with the aim of producing around 200 train carriages per year for Russian Railways. By 2017, 80 percent of the production of these trains is expected to be localized in Russia.

On 7 September 2011, Russian Railways placed an order for up to 1,200 Desiro RUS train carriages. The contract was signed by the President of Russian Railways Vladimir Yakunin, Siemens CEO and Chairman of the Management Board Peter Löscher, and President of Sinara Group Dmitry Pumpyansky at the international railway business forum Expo 1520 in Shcherbinka.

Russian Railways also has a maintenance contract with Siemens for 54 trains, ordered in 2009 and 2010. The contract with a value exceeding 500 € million was signed by Vladimir Yakunin and Peter Löscher and came into force in 2013 for a period of 40 years.

On 11 November 2013, Ural Locomotives started manufacturing a new model developed for 3 kV-only routes with the interior designed for city lines. It was designated as ES2G. In 2014, manufacturing ES1 on Siemens factory was finished. On the third quarter of 2016 ES2G started their work on MCC, earlier and now they are working as suburban trains on Moscow–Tver line (Moscow–Zelenograd and Moscow–Tver) and on Yekaterinburg suburban lines. In August 2017, 72 trains were produced.

In March 2016, Ural Locomotives transferred to RZD a new train designated as ES2GP, which is technically similar to ES2G, but designed for intercity lines and has not only standard 3rd-class seats like ES2G, but also 1st- and 2nd-class seats. In March 2017 train have only trial runs.

Lines

Operating

Northwestern Russia
 St. Petersburg – Moscow
 St. Petersburg – Novgorod
 St. Petersburg – Valday
 St. Petersburg – Staraya Russa
 St. Petersburg – Petrozavodsk
 St. Petersburg – Sortavala
 St. Petersburg – Ruskeala
 St. Petersburg – Volkhov
 St. Petersburg – Vyborg
 St. Petersburg – Pskov
 St. Petersburg – Kalishe
 St. Petersburg – Oranienbaum
 St. Petersburg – Luga
 St. Petersburg – Pechory
 St. Petersburg – Tikhvin
 St. Petersburg – Kuznechnoye
 St. Petersburg – Sosnovo
 St. Petersburg – Tosno
 Petrozavodsk – Pskov

Moscow
 Moscow Central Circle
 Moscow – Nizhny Novgorod
 Moscow – Kursk
 Moscow – Oryol
 Moscow – Konakovo
 Moscow – Smolensk
 Moscow – Tver
 Moscow – Zelenograd
 Moscow – Ivanovo
 Moscow – Kostroma

South Russia
 Krasnodar – Adler
 Krasnodar – Rostov-on-Don
 Novorossiysk – Rostov-on-Don
 Maikop – Adler
 Sochi – Sochi International Airport
 Sochi – Roza Khutor
 Sochi – Olympic Park
 Tuapse – Olympic Park
 Tuapse – Sochi International Airport
 Lazarevskaya – Sochi International Airport
 Dagomys – Sochi International Airport

Urals
 Yekaterinburg – Nizhny Tagil
 Yekaterinburg – Kamensk-Uralsky
 Yekaterinburg – Pervouralsk – Kuzino

Planned
 Mineralnye Vody – Sochi
 Barnaul – Novosibirsk

See also
 Sapsan
 Allegro
 Strizh

References

External links
 ES1, ES1P, ES2G and ES2GP at TrainPix.org
 ES1 and ES2G at Rus-etrain.ru
 ES1 and ES2G at Parovoz.com
 ES1 at Train-Photo.ru

High-speed trains of Russia
Electric multiple units of Russia
Railway services introduced in 2013
Siemens multiple units
3000 V DC multiple units
25 kV AC multiple units